The 2022–23 season is the 119th season in the existence of Royal Antwerp F.C. and the club's sixth consecutive season in the top flight of Belgian football. In addition to the domestic league, Antwerp are participating in this season's editions of the Belgian Cup and the UEFA Europa Conference League.

Players

First-team squad

Other players under contract

Out on loan

Transfers

In

Out 

Notes

Pre-season and friendlies

Competitions

Overall record

First Division A

League table

Results summary

Results by round

Matches 
The league fixtures were announced on 22 June 2022.

Belgian Cup

UEFA Europa Conference League

Second qualifying round 
The draw for the second qualifying round was held on 15 June 2022.

Third qualifying round 
The draw for the third qualifying round was held on 18 July 2022.

Play-off round 
The draw for the play-off round was held on 2 August 2022.

Goalscorers

References

Royal Antwerp F.C. seasons
Antwerp
2022–23 UEFA Europa Conference League participants seasons